Frances Gage may refer to:
Frances M. Gage (1924–2017), Canadian sculptor
 Frances Dana Barker Gage  (1808–1884), American reformer, feminist and abolitionist